Oakton is an unincorporated community in Barton County, in the U.S. state of Missouri.

History
A post office called Oakton was established in 1897, and remained in operation until 1901. The community was named for oak trees near the original town site.

References

Unincorporated communities in Barton County, Missouri
Unincorporated communities in Missouri